This is a list of members of the National Salvation Front Council (CFSN), the provisional governing organization in Romania after the National Salvation Front (FSN) seized power during the Romanian Revolution, on 22 December 1989.

Members
The list was broadcast on the national television and first published in Monitorul Oficial, no. 1 on the same day.

 
 Alexandru Bârlădeanu
 Ana Blandiana
 Silviu Brucan
 Valeriu Bucurescu
 Ion Caramitru
 Constantin Cârjan
 Cristina Ciontu
 Doina Cornea
 Marțian Dan
 Dan Deșliu
 Mircea Dinescu
 
 Captain 
 Manole Gheorghe
 General Ștefan Gușă
 Ion Iliescu
 
 Magdalena Ionescu
 Eugenia Iorga
 Mihai Ispas
 
 Captain 
 Corneliu Mănescu
 Dumitru Mazilu
 Marian Mierla
 Mihai Montanu
 Aurel Dragoș Munteanu
 Vasile Neacșa
 Paul Negrițiu
 Sergiu Nicolaescu
 Petre Roman
 Adrian Sârbu
 General Victor Stănculescu
 
 László Tőkés
 Ovidiu Vlad
 
 General

Executive Bureau
In the evening of 27 December 1989, the Executive Bureau of the CFSN was established. The Bureau consisted of 11 members:
President: Ion Iliescu
First vice-president: Dumitru Mazilu
Vice-presidents: Cazimir Ionescu and Károly Király
Secretary: Marțian Dan
Members: Bogdan Teodoriu, Vasile Neacșa, Silviu Brucan, Ion Caramitru, and

Quitting the CFSN
 23 January 1990: Doina Cornea
 26 January 1990: Dumitru Mazilu
 29 January 1990: Ana Blandiana
 4 February 1990: Silviu Brucan

References

External links

National Salvation Front Council
 
Romanian Revolution
Provisional governments